Maliheh-ye Hajj Badr (also Romanized as Malīḩeh-ye Ḩājj Badr) is a village in Hoveyzeh Rural District, in the Central District of Hoveyzeh County, Khuzestan Province, Iran. At the 2006 census, its population was 385, in 63 families.

References 

Populated places in Hoveyzeh County